Muhammad Tanveer (born 1 February 1981) is a cricketer who plays for the Qatar national cricket team. He was named in Qatar's squad for the 2017 ICC World Cricket League Division Five tournament in South Africa. His first fixture of the tournament was against Guernsey, on 6 September 2017.

He made his Twenty20 International (T20I) debut for Qatar against Saudi Arabia on 21 January 2019 in the 2019 ACC Western Region T20 tournament. In October 2021, he was named in Qatar's squad for the Group A matches in the 2021 ICC Men's T20 World Cup Asia Qualifier.

In July 2022, he was named in Qatar's squad for the 2022 Canada Cricket World Cup Challenge League A tournament. He made his List A debut on 28 July 2022, for Qatar against Singapore.

References

External links
 

1981 births
Living people
Qatari cricketers
Qatar Twenty20 International cricketers
Pakistani expatriates in Qatar
Place of birth missing (living people)